Regina Rykova (born 1991) is a Kazakhstani racewalker. In 2017, she competed in the women's 20 kilometres walk event at the 2017 World Athletics Championships held in London, United Kingdom. She finished in 52nd place.

In 2016, she competed in the women's 20 km walk at the 2016 IAAF World Race Walking Team Championships held in Rome, Italy.

References

External links 
 

Living people
1991 births
Place of birth missing (living people)
Kazakhstani female racewalkers
World Athletics Championships athletes for Kazakhstan